Cerastium is a genus of annual, winter annual, or perennial plants belonging to the family Caryophyllaceae. They are commonly called mouse-ear chickweed. Species are found nearly worldwide but the greatest concentration is in the northern temperate regions. There are about 200 species. A number are common weeds in fields and on disturbed ground.

Cerastium species are used as food plants by the larvae of some Lepidoptera species including Coleophora chalcogrammella (which feeds exclusively on Cerastium arvense) and Coleophora striatipennella (which has been recorded on Cerastium fontanum).

Selected species
Cerastium aleuticum – Aleutian chickweed
Cerastium alpinum – alpine chickweed
Cerastium arcticum – arctic mouse-ear chickweed
Cerastium arvense – field chickweed
Cerastium axillare – Trans-Pecos chickweed
Cerastium beeringinanum – Bering chickweed
Cerastium bialynickii
Cerastium biebersteinii – boreal chickweed
Cerastium brachypetalum – gray chickweed
Cerastium brachypodum – shortstalk chickweed
Cerastium cerastoides – mountain chickweed
Cerastium dichotomum – forked chickweed
Cerastium diffusum – fourstamen chickweed
Cerastium dubium – doubtful chickweed
Cerastium fischerianum – Fischer's chickweed
Cerastium fontanum – common mouse-ear chickweed
Cerastium furcatum – Korean mouse-ear chickweed
Cerastium glomeratum – sticky chickweed
Cerastium gorodkovianum – tundra chickweed
Cerastium gracile – slender chickweed
Cerastium maximum – great chickweed
Cerastium nigrescens – Shetland mouse-ear chickweed
Cerastium nutans – nodding chickweed
Cerastium pumilum – European chickweed
Cerastium regelii – Regel's chickweed
Cerastium semidecandrum – five-stamen chickweed
Cerastium sordidum – Chihuahuan chickweed
Cerastium subtriflorum – Slovenian mouse-ear chickweed
Cerastium sventenii
Cerastium sylvaticum
Cerastium terrae-novae – Newfoundland mouse-ear chickweed 
Cerastium texanum – Texas chickweed
Cerastium tomentosum – snow in summer
Cerastium utriense

References

External links

USDA Plants Profile: Cerastium

 
Caryophyllaceae genera
Taxa named by Carl Linnaeus